The 1949 Internationale Tulpenrallye was the 1st Internationale Tulpenrallye. It was won by Ken Wharton.

Results

References

Rally competitions in the Netherlands
Internationale